The Randomers is a 2014 romantic film from the Irish director Graham Jones about a young woman on the west coast of Ireland who places an advertisement seeking a male for a relationship without speaking.

References

External links 
 

2014 films
2014 romantic comedy films
Irish romantic comedy films
2010s English-language films